Westmoravian College Třebíč (Czech: Západomoravská vysoká škola Třebíč) is a private university in Třebíč, Czech Republic.

The college was founded in 2003 in place of the school ZŠ Za rybníkem in Borovina. The first class graduated in 2006. Approximately 700 students study at the school.

Classes 

The school offers four fields of study: Management and Marketing, Public administration, Information management and Applied information technology.

References

External links 
Official website
WEstmoravian College Trebic. University Directory. Accessed May 9, 2012.

Universities in the Czech Republic
Schools in Třebíč
2003 establishments in the Czech Republic
Educational institutions established in 2003